Copelatus bolivianus is a species of diving beetle. It is part of the genus Copelatus in the subfamily Copelatinae of the family Dytiscidae. It was described by Guignot in 1957.

References

bolivianus
Beetles described in 1957
Beetles of Africa